The 1970–71 Drexel Dragons men's basketball team represented Drexel University during the 1970–71 men's basketball season. The Dragons, led by 3rd year head coach Frank Szymanski, played their home games at the 32nd Street Armory and were members of the University–Eastern division of the Middle Atlantic Conferences (MAC).

The team finished the season 7–17, and finished in 7th place in the University–Eastern division of the MAC in the regular season.

Roster

Schedule

|-
!colspan=9 style="background:#F8B800; color:#002663;"| Regular season
|-

References

Drexel Dragons men's basketball seasons
Drexel
1970 in sports in Pennsylvania
1971 in sports in Pennsylvania